Ystrad Mynach railway station is a railway station serving the town of Ystrad Mynach, south Wales. It is a stop on the Rhymney Line of the Valley Lines network.

From 2020, the rail linc bus (901) that links with the train no longer operated. It operated to Maesycwmmer, Pontllanfraith, and ended at Blackwood.

History
Ystrad Mynach railway station was on the Rhymney Railway opened in 1858. It consisted of staggered platforms on the main line, as well as a separate platform on the Dowlais line. Nearby Penallta Junction gave access to the Great Western Railway and the Aberdare Valley, opened 1 April 1871 and the Cylla branch opened on 1 August 1906 to access the new Powell Duffryn owned Penallta Colliery. The latter line closed in 1991 and has since been lifted, but the former is still in use (for freight only) as far as Cwmbargoed to serve the coal washery and associated opencast mine at Ffos-Y-Fran. Coal from there is sent to Aberthaw Power Station in bulk trainloads.

In 2014, the station underwent a £1.6 million refurbishment with new ticket machines, waiting areas and ticket office, with disabled toilet being installed in addition to major work carried out on the footbridge with lifts being installed to improve accessibility.

The northbound platform is signalled for use in both directions, to permit trains from Cardiff to terminate & start back from there.

Ystrad Mynach railway station was used as a location in the pilot episode of Porridge (Prisoner and Escort), part of the series Seven of One, starring Ronnie Barker.

Service

In the evening, there is an hourly service to Rhymney & Cardiff/Penarth and on Sundays there is a two-hourly service each way, with southbound trains running to Barry Island.

References

External links

Railway stations in Caerphilly County Borough
DfT Category E stations
Former Rhymney Railway stations
Railway stations in Great Britain opened in 1858
Railway stations served by Transport for Wales Rail